Meg Galliard (born 8 August 1973) is an American yacht racer who competed in the 2004 Summer Olympics.

References

1973 births
Living people
American female sailors (sport)
Olympic sailors of the United States
Sailors at the 2004 Summer Olympics – Europe
Place of birth missing (living people)